Mozabite may refer to:
the Mozabite people 
the Mozabite language